Kempsville is a historic home located near Shacklefords, Gloucester County, Virginia.  It was built about 1787, and is a -story, four bay, gable roofed brick dwelling. with a single pile, central passage plan. It has a -story wing and rear ell. It features "T"-shaped chimneys.

It was added to the National Register of Historic Places in 1978.

References

Houses on the National Register of Historic Places in Virginia
Houses completed in 1787
Houses in Gloucester County, Virginia
National Register of Historic Places in Gloucester County, Virginia
1787 establishments in Virginia